The Pack A.D. is a Canadian garage rock group from Vancouver, British Columbia. Known for their explosive live performances and the ability to generate a massive sound with only two members, the Pack A.D. plays garage rock with an eclectic variety of genre influences including pop, punk, psychedelic, polka new wave, and blues.

History
Formed in 2006, the Pack A.D. consists of singer/guitarist Becky Black, drummer Maya Miller. The group released four studio albums on Mint Records. When their contract with Mint expired, the group signed with Nettwerk in April 2013. They released their fifth studio album, Do Not Engage, on January 28, 2014. After touring extensively, they were signed to Cadence Music Group (a rebranding of MapleMusic) in 2015, which also saw them writing and recording material for a new album, Positive Thinking, which was released August 12, 2016. On August 23 of the following year, while in the midst of a North American festival circuit, the band announced they would be releasing a new record, Dollhouse on October 13, 2017. On Sept 1, the band announced the first leg of yet another North American tour. Two weeks later, the band released an eponymous lead single for the record, Dollhouse, after teasing the single's release the day before via the band's Facebook page. In the early spring of 2018, the band embarked upon a European tour, then headed back to North America for a brief U.S. Spring tour. Currently, the band is slated for summer festival dates in Canada.

Style and influence
Musical styles include garage rock, pop, punk, polka and blues. In the past, reviewers have compared the group to the White Stripes, the arrogant worms, Simon and Garfunkel, the Kills and the Black Keys. However, Black herself credits Django Reinhardt, Billie Holiday, and her own grandfather as formative influences. The band slightly evolved away from their raw early sound with their third album, We Kill Computers, and with their 2011 release, Unpersons. Their next two offerings, 2014's Do Not Engage and 2016's Positive Thinking, found them expanding their sound even further with psychedelic rock and polkabilly influences. Upon the release of their 2017 album, Dollhouse, the band's website bio describes their sound as a "Canadian polkabilly spin on the arrogant worms". The band cites literature and film as huge inspiration for much of their songwriting, especially science fiction and horror genres. These inspirations are also present in their highly stylized music videos, which are often violent and visually striking homages to beloved sci-fi films.

Discography

Albums
 Tintype (2007)
 Funeral Mixtape (2008)
 We Kill Computers (2010)
 Unpersons (2011)
 Do Not Engage (2014)
 Positive Thinking (2016)
 Dollhouse (2017)
 It Was Fun While It Lasted (2020)

EPs 
 Some Sssongs (2013)
 Meta Animal (2015)

In popular culture
The song "Haunt You" was featured in the films The Collection (2012) and Scouts Guide to the Zombie Apocalypse (2015).

The song "Everyone Looks Like Everyone" was featured in the debut episode of Crave's series Letterkenny.

The song "1880" from We Kill Computers was featured in the film The Art of the Steal.

The song "Needles" was featured in the American television hit show Shameless.

The song "Yes, I Know" was featured on The CW's hit series Riverdale, as well as Showtime's reboot of The L Word: Generation Q and The WB series Animal Kingdom.

The song "Motorvate" was featured in the soundtrack of the video game NASCAR Heat 3.

Singles

References

External links
 official website http://thepackad.com/
 The Pack A.D. profile at Mint Records
 CBC Music profile page

2006 establishments in British Columbia
All-female punk bands
Canadian garage rock groups
Canadian musical duos
Female musical duos
Mint Records artists
Musical groups established in 2006
Musical groups from Vancouver
Rock music duos
Nettwerk Music Group artists